Eastern Han Chinese, Later Han Chinese or Late Old Chinese  is the stage of the Chinese language revealed by poetry and glosses from the Eastern Han period (first two centuries AD).
It is considered an intermediate stage between Old Chinese and the Middle Chinese of the 7th-century Qieyun dictionary.

Sources 
The rhyming practice of Han poets has been studied since the Qing period as an intermediate stage between the Shijing of the Western Zhou period and Tang poetry.
The definitive reference was compiled by Luo Changpei and Zhou Zumo in 1958.
This monumental work identifies the rhyme classes of the period, but leaves the phonetic value of each class open.

In the Eastern Han period, Confucian scholars were bitterly divided between different versions of the classics: the officially recognized New Texts, and the Old Texts, recently found versions written in a pre-Qin script.
To support their challenge to the orthodox position on the classics, Old Text scholars produced many philological studies.
Many of these works contain remarks of various types on the pronunciation of various words.
The sources with the most glosses are the Shiming, a dictionary of classical terms, Xu Shen's Shuowen Jiezi, a study of the history and structure of Chinese characters, and Zheng Xuan's commentaries on various classics.

Buddhism also expanded greatly in China during the Eastern Han period.
Buddhist missionaries, beginning with An Shigao in AD 148, began translating Buddhist texts into Chinese.
These translations include transcriptions in Chinese characters of Sanskrit and Prakrit names and terms, which were first systematically mined for evidence of the evolution of Chinese phonology by Edwin Pulleyblank.

The Shiming glosses were collected and studied by Nicholas Bodman.
Weldon South Coblin collected all the remaining glosses and transcriptions, and used them in an attempt to reconstruct an intermediate stage between Old Chinese and Middle Chinese, both represented by the reconstructions of Li Fang-Kuei.
Axel Schuessler included reconstructed pronunciations (under the name Later Han Chinese) in his dictionary of Old Chinese.

The customary writing style of the period was strongly modelled on the classics, and thus provides only occasional glimpses of contemporary grammar.
However, some works, while generally following the conventional archaizing style, contain passages in a more colloquial style thought to reflect contemporary speech, at least in part.
Many such examples are found in translated Buddhist literature, particularly direct speech.
Similarly, Zhao Qi's commentary on Mencius includes paraphrases of the classic written for the benefit of novice students, and therefore in a more contemporary style.
Similar passages are also found in the commentaries of Wang Yi, Zheng Xuan and Gao You.

Dialects 

Several texts contain evidence of dialectal variation in the Eastern Han period.
The Fangyan, from the start of the period, discusses variations in regional vocabulary.
By analysing the text, Paul Serruys identified six dialect areas: a central area centred on the Central Plain east of Hangu Pass, surrounded by northern, eastern, southern and western areas, and a southeastern area to the south and east of the lower Yangtze.
Distinct rhyme systems of the Han period poets identified by Luo and Zhou broadly correspond to these dialect areas.

The most influential dialect was the Qin–Jin dialect, from the western group, reflecting the ascendency of the state of Qin.
Second was the Chu dialect, from the southern group, which spread both to the south and to the east.
These two dialects were also the principal sources of the Han standard language.
The central dialects of the area of former states of Lu, Song and Wei were the most conservative.
The dialects of the eastern area, which had been more recently and slowly Sinified, include some non-Chinese vocabulary.

The Eastern Han glosses come from 11 sites, all to the north of the Huai River.
They often show marked phonological differences.
Many of them exhibit mergers that are not found in the 7th-century Qieyun or in many modern varieties.
The exception is the Buddhist transcriptions, suggesting that the later varieties descend from Han-period varieties spoken in the region of Luoyang (in the western part of the central dialect area).

The southeastern dialects are not reflected in Eastern Han texts.
They were known as Wu or Jiangdong dialects in the Western Jin period, when the writer Guo Pu described them as quite distinct from other varieties.
Jerry Norman called these Han-era southeastern dialects Old Southern Chinese, and suggested that they were the source of common features found in the oldest layers of modern Yue, Hakka and Min varieties.

Phonology 

Eastern Han Chinese syllables consisted of an initial consonant, optional medial glides, a vowel and an optional coda.

Initial consonants 
The consonant clusters postulated for Old Chinese had generally disappeared by the Eastern Han period.

One of the major changes between Old Chinese and Middle Chinese was palatalization of initial dental stops and (in some environments) velar stops, merging to form a new series of palatal initials.
Several Eastern Han varieties show either or both of these palatalizations.
However, Proto-Min, which branched off during the Han period, has palatalized velars but not dentals.
The retroflex stops and sibilants of Middle Chinese are not distinguished from plain stops and sibilants in the Eastern Han data.

There is some uncertainty whether the Middle Chinese initials g-, ɣ- and j- can all be derived from a single Old Chinese initial , or whether an additional fricative initial  or  must be reconstructed.

Some Eastern Han dialects show evidence of the voiceless sonorant initials postulated for Old Chinese, but they had disappeared by the Eastern Han period in most areas.
The gap was filled by Old Chinese , which yielded Eastern Han  and Middle Chinese l.
In some Eastern Han dialects, this initial may have been a lateral tap or flap.

Medial glides 
Most modern reconstructions of Old Chinese distinguish labiovelar and labiolaryngeal initials from the velar and laryngeal series.
However, the two series are not separated in Eastern Han glosses, suggesting that Eastern Han Chinese had a  medial like Middle Chinese.
Most OC reconstructions include a medial  to account for Middle Chinese retroflex initials, division-II finals and some chongniu finals, and this seems to have still been a distinct phoneme in the Eastern Han period.

Since the pioneering work of Bernhard Karlgren, it has been common to project the palatal medial of Middle Chinese division-III syllables back to an Old Chinese medial , but this has been challenged by several authors, partly because Eastern Han Buddhist transcriptions use such syllables for foreign words lacking any palatal element.
However, Coblin points out that this practice continued into the Tang period, for which a -j- medial is generally accepted.
Scholars agree that the difference reflects a real phonological distinction, but there have been a range of proposals for its realization in early periods.
The distinction is variously described in Eastern Han commentaries:
 He Xiu (何休, mid 2nd century) describes syllables that gave rise to Middle Chinese -j- as 'outside and shallow', while others are said to be 'inside and deep'.
 Gao You (early 3rd century) describes the former as 'urgent breath' and the latter as 'slack breath'. Pan Wuyun and Zhengzhang Shangfang interpreted this as a short/long distinction, but a more literal reading suggests a tense/lax contrast.

Vowels 
Eastern Han rhyming practice indicates that some of the changes found in Middle Chinese had already occurred:
 The finals  and  had merged (Middle Chinese -æ).
 The following splits and mergers of finals had occurred:

The Middle Chinese finals -jo and -je occur with finals of all kinds, while -jæ occurs only after plain sibilant and palatal initials, with no known conditioning factor.

Codas 
The Middle Chinese codas -p, -t, -k, -m and -ng are projected back onto Eastern Han Chinese.
The Middle Chinese coda -n also appears to reflect  in most cases, but in some cases reflects vocalic codas in some Eastern Han varieties.
Baxter and Sagart argue that these words had a coda  in Old Chinese, which became  in Shandong and adjacent areas, and  elsewhere.

Middle Chinese syllables with vocalic or nasal codas fell into three tonal categories, traditionally known as even, rising and departing tones, with syllables having stop codas assigned to a fourth "entering tone" category.
Several Buddhist transcriptions indicate that  was still present in the Eastern Han period in words derived from Old Chinese .
Other departing tone syllables may have become  by the Eastern Han period, as suggested by a slight preference to use them to transcribe Indic long vowels.
Based on Haudricourt's analysis of Vietnamese tones, Edwin Pulleyblank suggested that the Middle Chinese rising tone derived from Old Chinese .
Syllables in this category were avoided when transcribing long vowels in the Eastern Han period, suggesting that they were shorter, possibly reflecting this final glottal stop.

Grammar 
In comparison with Warring States texts, colloquial Eastern Han texts display a massive increase in compound content words in clearly distinguished word classes.
They also make much less use of function words in favour of periphrasis.

The monosyllabic words of the classical period were largely replaced by disyllabic compounds with clearly defined syntactic roles:
 verbs, such as   'mourn',   'rejoice',   'be beautiful' and   'activate';
 nouns, such as   'house',   'acquaintance',   'place',   'body' and   'people';
 adverbs, such as   'all',   'personally', 'together' and   'then'.

The widespread use of measure words between numerals or demonstratives and nouns, a characteristic of the modern language, began in the Han period and became more extensive in the following Northern and Southern dynasties period.

Old Chinese had a range of personal pronouns, including case distinctions.
In the Eastern Han, these were reduced to first person   and second person  .
Similarly, the demonstratives were almost exclusively reduced to   'this',   'such' and   'that'.
Most of the interrogatives of Old Chinese were replaced with periphrastic forms.

The demonstrative   also came to be used as a copular verb in sentences of the form A  B (as in modern Chinese), replacing the typical classical pattern A B .
Unlike any other verb,   was not negated with   – the negative copula   was retained from the classical language.

In classical texts, the particle   marked a rhetorical question, for which a negative answer was expected, but in the Eastern Han it was a general question marker.
At the same time, a new question marker   appeared.

Notes

References

Citations

Works cited 

 
 
 
 
 
 
 
 
 
 
 
 
 
 
 
 

History of the Chinese language
Han dynasty culture